Inventions & Dimensions is the third album by Herbie Hancock, recorded on August 30th, 1963 for Blue Note Records. It features Hancock with bassist Paul Chambers and percussionists Willie Bobo and Chihuahua Martinez. The album was reissued in the 1970s as Succotash, credited to Hancock and Bobo, but with the sides reversed. Inventions & Dimensions is unusual in prominently featuring Latin percussion whilst not being a Latin jazz album, rather presenting Hancock's further exploration of modal jazz and post-bop idioms.

Track listing
All compositions by Herbie Hancock
"Succotash" – 7:40
"Triangle" – 11:01
"Jack Rabbit" – 5:57
"Mimosa" – 8:38
"A Jump Ahead" – 6:33
"Mimosa" (alternate take) – 10:06 Bonus track on reissue

Personnel

Herbie Hancock – piano
Paul Chambers – bass
Willie Bobo – drums, timbales
Osvaldo "Chihuahua" Martinez – percussion (not on track 5)

References

1963 albums
Herbie Hancock albums
Albums produced by Alfred Lion
Blue Note Records albums